Elaeocarpus ruminatus, commonly known as brown quandong, caloon or grey quandong,    is a species of flowering plant in the family Elaeocarpaceae and is endemic to Queensland. It is a tree with buttress roots at the base of the trunk, mostly more or less elliptic leaves, cream-coloured flowers with five petals that sometimes have a divided tip, and more or less spherical fruit.

Description
There are sixteen to twenty-two stamens and the ovary is covered with short, felted hairs.

Taxonomy
Elaeocarpus ruminatus was first formally described in 1872 by Ferdinand von Mueller in Fragmenta Phytographiae Australiae from material collected by John Dallachy near Rockingham Bay.

Distribution and habitat

Conservation status
Brown quandong is listed as of "least concern" under the Queensland Government Nature Conservation Act 1992.

References

Oxalidales of Australia
ruminatus
Flora of Queensland
Plants described in 1872
Endemic flora of Australia
Taxa named by Ferdinand von Mueller